Bruksvallarna is a village situated in Härjedalen Municipality in Jämtland County, Sweden. 
Its relatively high altitude, 720 meters,  provides a long ski season.  Bruksvallsloppet,  an international Cross-country skiing competition, is held annually in Bruksvallarna  during the month of November. The village had 95 inhabitants in 2010.

Bruksvallarna Chapel was inaugurated on 2 September 1978. The chapel has a stand-alone bell tower erected in 1980. It is in the parish of  Tännäs-Ljusnedal (Tännäs-Ljusnedals församling) in the Diocese of Härnösand.

References

Populated places in Härjedalen Municipality
Härjedalen